Julián Manuele (born 30 October 1966 in La Plata) is a former Argentine rugby union player. He played as a fly-half.

Career
He played for all his career for La Plata Rugby Club
, where he also played alongside players such as Guillermo Angaut and German Llanes. He was called up for the Argentina national rugby union team prior to the 1987 Rugby World Cup, however, he did not play any match in the tournament due to an injury, with the first choice fly-half being Hugo Porta.
 He was also part of the 1995 La Plata squad which won the Nacional de Clubes in that year.

Notes

1966 births
Living people
Sportspeople from La Plata
Argentine rugby union players
Rugby union fly-halves